Maximilian Adolph Otto Siegfried Schmeling (28 September 1905 – 2 February 2005) was a German boxer who was heavyweight champion of the world between 1930 and 1932. His two fights with Joe Louis in 1936 and 1938 were worldwide cultural events because of their national associations.  Schmeling is the only boxer to win the world heavyweight championship on a foul.

Starting his professional career in 1924, Schmeling went to the United States in 1928 and, after a ninth-round technical knockout of Johnny Risko, became a sensation. He became the first to win the heavyweight championship (at that time vacant) by disqualification in 1930, after opponent Jack Sharkey knocked him down with a low blow in the fourth round. Schmeling retained his crown successfully in 1931 by a technical knockout victory over Young Stribling. A rematch in 1932 with Sharkey saw the American gaining the title from Schmeling by a controversial fifteen-round split decision. In 1933, Schmeling lost to Max Baer by a tenth-round technical knockout. The loss left people believing that Schmeling was past his prime. Meanwhile, Adolf Hitler and the Nazi Party took over control in Germany, but Schmeling never joined the Party. The same year, he married Czech film actress Anny Ondra.

In 1936, in their first fight, Schmeling knocked out American rising star Joe Louis, placing him as the number one contender for Jim Braddock's title, but Louis got the fight and knocked Braddock out to win the championship in 1937. Schmeling finally got a chance to regain his title in 1938 in the rematch, but Louis won by technical knockout in the first round. During World War II, Schmeling served with the German Air Force as a paratrooper. After the war, Schmeling mounted a comeback, but retired permanently in 1948. After retiring from boxing, Schmeling worked for The Coca-Cola Company. Schmeling became friends with Louis, and their friendship lasted until the latter's death in 1981. Schmeling died in 2005 aged 99, a sporting hero in his native Germany. Long after the Second World War, it was revealed that Schmeling had risked his life to save the lives of two Jewish children in 1938. At the age of 99, Schmeling was the longest living heavyweight boxing champion in history.

In 2003, Schmeling was ranked 55 on The Ring magazine's list of 100 greatest punchers of all time.

Biography

Early years
Max Schmeling, Jr. was born in Klein Luckow, in the Prussian Province of Brandenburg, the son of Max, Sr. and Amanda (née Fuchs) Schmeling. He had an older brother, Rudolf, born in 1902 and a younger sister, Edith, born in 1913. He first became acquainted with boxing as a teenager, when his father took him to watch film of the heavyweight championship match between Jack Dempsey and Georges Carpentier. Impressed with Dempsey's performance in that fight, young Schmeling became determined to imitate his new hero. He began boxing in amateur competitions and, by 1924, won Germany's national amateur title in the light heavyweight division. Shortly thereafter, he turned professional. Ironically, though he idolised the raging, brawling Dempsey, Schmeling developed a careful, scientific style of fighting that lent itself more to counterpunching. Using this style, he won seventeen of his first twenty-three bouts, thirteen by knockout. In 1925, he got into the ring with Dempsey, who was then still heavyweight champion of the world and was touring Europe. Dempsey boxed for two rounds with the then-unknown German and, according to a story later told by Schmeling, was greatly impressed. He proved Dempsey's praises correct on 24 August 1926, when picking up the German light heavyweight championship with a first-round knockout of rival Max Diekmann, who had previously beaten Schmeling. The next year, Schmeling won the European championship by stopping Fernand Delarge in the first boxing match broadcast live in Germany. After defending both titles against Hein Domgoergen the same year and, in 1928, the European Title with a first-round knockout of Michele Bonaglia, he secured the German heavyweight championship with a points victory against Franz Diener and decided to chase bigger fights and bigger purses in the United States.

Arriving in New York City for the first time in 1928, Schmeling was hardly noticed by the American fight circles. Considered a stiff European fighter who had padded his record against German and European unknowns, he was given few opportunities to prove himself until he hooked up with American manager Joe Jacobs. Schmeling's debut in America took place at Madison Square Garden with an eighth-round knockout of Joe Monte, who was not a top-flight heavyweight but nonetheless had been in with some tough competition. Two more victories led to a fight with Johnny Risko, one of the biggest names in the division, though somewhat beyond his prime. On 1 February 1929, Schmeling floored Risko four times with his right hand before the referee halted the contest in the ninth round, handing Risko his only loss by TKO. The surprised crowd in attendance roared with appreciation and The Ring magazine subsequently recognized the win as its 'Fight of the Year.'

The "Low Blow Champion"

When he defeated the highly regarded Spaniard Paulino Uzcudun via a fifteen-round decision at Yankee Stadium later that year, Schmeling was regarded as the foremost young contender in the division. With the World Heavyweight Champion Gene Tunney having recently retired, promoters arranged a matchup between the German and veteran contender Jack Sharkey to fill the vacancy. On 12 June 1930, at Yankee Stadium, in a fight billed as the 'Battle of the Continents,' Schmeling, known as a slow starter, fell slightly behind on points going into the fourth round. He was trying to corner his opponent when Sharkey let loose with a very fast, clear hit to the groin. Schmeling fell to the canvas, claiming to have been fouled. When manager Jacobs ran into the ring, prompting chaos, the referee disqualified Sharkey and declared Schmeling the victor and the first man to win the world heavyweight championship on a foul. The New York State Athletic Commission (NYSAC), reviewing the call, agreed.

The first European-born boxer to win the heavyweight championship in thirty-three years, Schmeling was also the first from Germany to hold the distinction. Still, the way in which he won the title proved an embarrassment. Called the 'low blow champion,' he was disparaged in both America and Europe as an unproven titleholder. When he initially refused to face Sharkey in a rematch, the NYSAC officially stripped him of their recognition as world champion, but he remained recognised by both the National Boxing Association (NBA) and The Ring magazine. Most of the criticism faded after Schmeling's first defence, a fifteen-round TKO over Young Stribling, a future hall-of-famer with 239 wins to his credit by 1931. In order to solidify his title as undisputed, Schmeling signed a contract to face the "Boston Gob" once more. On 21 June 1932, the championship picture became even more muddled when Sharkey won a highly controversial split decision, taking the championship. Many in attendance, including former heavyweight champion Gene Tunney and the mayor of New York, felt that Schmeling had proven himself the better man and was robbed. In losing the championship, the German had elevated his reputation in the minds of boxing fans.

Walker and Baer
When Schmeling faced Mickey Walker, the future hall-of-famer who had recently held Sharkey to a draw that many felt Walker deserved, it was thought that this fight was for the real heavyweight championship. Walker, a former welterweight, was a popular slugger who had won championships in two divisions but was at a considerable size disadvantage against the European. Though Walker took the lead on points, Schmeling dealt out a beating as the fight progressed. After eight rounds, Walker's corner threw in the towel, confirming Schmeling's status as the leading heavyweight in the world.

With the coming of 1933, however, Schmeling's image in America began to take a decided turn. In 1932, the Nazi Party became the most powerful political force in Germany, and its ideologies, voiced by party leader Adolf Hitler, overflowed with anti-Semitic tendencies. Major American cities such as New York had large Jewish populations, who worried over what the party could mean for people of their religion in the future. Schmeling, because he was German, was viewed as an extension of Hitler's plans for world domination. When he was slated to fight heavy-hitting contender Max Baer on 8 June 1933, he immediately became the 'bad guy' in the eyes of fans. Baer, who did not practice the Jewish religion but had a Jewish father, came into the ring wearing the Star of David on his shorts. Promoter Jack Dempsey played up this angle and suddenly the fight was viewed as Baer defending his faith against the prejudice of the Nazis, represented reluctantly by Schmeling. Thrown off of his game in part by the bad publicity but also because of Baer's wild, brawling style and frequent fouls (including backhand punches and rabbit punches), Schmeling was thrashed after ten rounds before nearly 60,000 onlookers at Yankee Stadium. When the German took a battering against the ropes in the tenth, the referee leapt in to stop the fight. The fight, combined with a follow-up loss to contender Steve Hamas early the next year, left many wondering if Schmeling was still a world top-class fighter.

Versus Joe Louis

Returning to his native Germany, Schmeling won three of his next four fights, with one draw, including knockout wins over first Walter Neusel, then another avenging his previous loss to Steve Hamas. However, many among the American press and fans remained unmoved on the idea of rooting for Schmeling in light of the Nazi Party's behavior. Articles continued to be published declaring the German "washed up", a "has been", or a "Nazi puppet". When he was matched with undefeated boxing sensation Joe Louis in 1936 for the German's first fight on American soil in more than two years, he was clearly the betting underdog, considered a name opponent for Louis to roll over on his route to the title. Nevertheless, he was the number two contender for the title behind Louis. Prior to the match, Schmeling carefully studied films of Louis's prior fights, dissecting apparent flaws in the Detroit fighter's technique. Among the weaknesses he noticed was the fact that Louis lowered his left hand after throwing a left jab. In the ring, Schmeling exploited this subtle flaw to his own advantage, countering nearly every Louis jab with his best punch, the right cross. The fight proved to be a competitive, hard-hitting affair for the first three rounds, but, in the fourth, a counter right from the German dropped Louis for the first time in his career. Though Louis rose, he was badly dazed for the remainder of the fight. For a further eight rounds, Schmeling battered Louis, often standing toe-to-toe with the vaunted puncher and landing that same right hand to the jaw repeatedly. In the twelfth, he sent the American tumbling to the floor once more, and this time Louis could not recover. He was counted out on the floor, and Schmeling had scored the most talked-about sports upset of the year.

Now the unexpected number one contender for the heavyweight crown held by Jim Braddock, Schmeling looked forward to his chance to become the first fighter to regain the world heavyweight title by winning the fight with Braddock that had been scheduled for that September. The fight was postponed, however, when Braddock injured his hand in training. Rumors existed that the fight's organizers were stalling, afraid of the negative publicity that would be generated over a perceived Nazi getting a shot at the world's title. When it was confirmed that Braddock's managers were in talks with the Louis camp, the New York Commission officially released an order for Braddock to fight Schmeling for the title. Any other fight, with Louis or otherwise, would not be recognized by New York as being for the championship. The Madison Square Garden Corporation, the largest promotional company in the sport at the time, even attempted to get a legal injunction against a Braddock-Louis fight (Louis was not on their roster). Nonetheless, in February 1937, Schmeling received the news that the champion had indeed signed to defend his championship against Louis. A furious Schmeling protested, but to no avail, and he was forced to watch from ringside as Louis knocked Braddock out and gained the championship. Sorely disappointed and convinced that he would never receive his chance at redemption, Schmeling fought just once more in America, an eighth-round knockout of future contender Harry Thomas, before returning to Germany. In his native land, Schmeling was regarded as a hero and promoted by the Nazi propaganda machine as a perfect example of German supremacy over the rest of the world by virtue of his defeat of the current champion, Louis. The government ordered parades and rallies in his honor. He became a friend to Hitler and other powerful figures in the government and also a popular subject of newspaper articles and films. He continued to press for a chance at a rematch with Louis and in the meantime padded his record against overmatched fighters Ben Foord and Steve Dudas.

"Battle of the Century"
In 1938, champion Joe Louis announced that he would face Schmeling for the title. The rematch became an instant international sensation. Many clamored impatiently for its happening, but others, afraid of international tensions and the possibility of Hitler taking over the championship, protested. The controversy and ballyhoo led to the event becoming the most anticipated boxing match since the rematch between Dempsey and Gene Tunney, or possibly earlier. Louis, with his poor, lower-class roots, was adopted by American fans as the symbol of America as a land of opportunity. In contrast, Americans perceived Schmeling and his ties to Hitler as an obvious threat to those opportunities and ideals. When the German walked to the ring at Yankee Stadium on 22 June 1938, he did so under a hail of garbage thrown from the stands. Louis came out blazing in the first round and Schmeling tried to counter-punch as he had in the first bout, but to no avail. Driven into the ropes and battered with a fusillade of short, crisp blows from every angle, Schmeling turned his back to his opponent and clutched onto the ropes, letting out a scream that even years later, many spectators could recall vividly. Schmeling later said that he screamed because he had been hit with a blow to the kidneys. Schmeling's knees buckled under the punishment, and referee Arthur Donovan pushed Louis away, beginning a count on Schmeling. Schmeling reluctantly stepped away from the ropes, and Donovan allowed him to continue. A few punches later, Schmeling was knocked down again. From then on, he was helpless. He rose but fell moments later, and Donovan stopped the fight.

Many years later, in 1975, Schmeling said, "Looking back, I'm almost happy I lost that fight. Just imagine if I would have come back to Germany with a victory. I had nothing to do with the Nazis, but they would have given me a medal. After the war I might have been considered a war criminal."

Schmeling in his later years

When he returned to Germany after his defeat by Joe Louis, Schmeling was now shunned by the Nazis. He won both the German and European heavyweight championships on the same night, with a first-round knockout of Adolf Heuser. During the Nazi purge of Jews from Berlin, he personally saved the lives of two Jewish children by hiding them in his apartment. It was not the first time that Schmeling defied the Nazi regime's hatred for Jews. As the story goes, Hitler let it be known through the Reich Ministry of Sports that he was very displeased at Schmeling's relationship with Joe Jacobs, his Jewish fight promoter, and wanted it terminated, but Schmeling refused to bow even to Hitler. During the war, Schmeling was drafted, where he served with the Luftwaffe and was trained as a paratrooper. He participated in the Battle of Crete in May 1941, where he was wounded in his right knee by mortar fire shrapnel during the first day of the battle. After recovering, he was dismissed from active service after being deemed medically unfit for duty because of his injury. Nevertheless, in July 1944 a rumor that he had been killed in action made world news. He later visited American P.O.W. camps in Germany and occasionally tried to help conditions for the prisoners. By early 1945, he was spending his time giving exhibition bouts against former British Free Corps member Eric Pleasants in German officers' messes.

After the war, Schmeling settled in Hamburg where in 1947, strapped for money, he embarked upon a moderately successful comeback in boxing, winning three of his five bouts with two point-defeats before re-entering retirement for good in October 1948. 

Schmeling became a successful mink, chicken, and tobacco farmer in the early 1950s. Towards the end of the decade, after multiple meetings with The Coca-Cola Company's offices in Germany, Schmeling became the face of 'Cocacolonization' and Coca-Cola's reentry into Germany. Before long, he owned his own bottling plant and held an executive's position within the company. Schmeling helped bring vending machines into use in Germany.

He became friends with Joe Louis and, although they were never close, he assisted his former rival financially in his later years, eventually financing his funeral in 1981.

His wife of 54 years, the Czech-born actress Anny Ondra, died in 1987. In 1992, he was inducted into the International Boxing Hall of Fame. His autobiography, Max Schmeling: An Autobiography, was published in 1994. He lived his remaining years as a wealthy man and avid boxing fan, dying on 2 February 2005, at the age of 99.

In 2010, a bronze statue of Schmeling was erected in Hollenstedt.

Honours
German Light Heavyweight Champion 1926–1928
European Light Heavyweight Champion 1927–1928
German Heavyweight Champion 1928
World Heavyweight Champion 1930–1932
European Heavyweight Champion 1939–1943

Cultural references

Schmeling lived in Stettin, Germany (now known as Szczecin, Poland); a band from this city, the Analogs, recorded the song "Max Schmeling" on their album Hlaskover rock (2000).

In a season 9 or 10 episode of "Law and Order", Schmeling's name is mentioned when the detectives are looking for a certain gun. The man who is supposed to own it is a fighter from the 1930s who went the distance with Schmeling in 1937.

Schmeling briefly appears as himself in the film The Zurich Engagement (1957)

The American-German film Joe and Max (2002) tells the true story of Joe Louis and Max Schmeling and their enduring friendship.

In the book The Amazing Adventures of Kavalier and Clay, Joe Kavalier is beaten up by someone who may or may not have been Max Schmeling. The author hints that it probably wasn't, as Schmeling should have been fighting in Poland at the time.

In Rocky IV, the climactic fight between American Rocky Balboa and Russian Ivan Drago was inspired by the bout between Joe Louis and Max Schmeling, updated to reflect Cold War relationships.

Schmeling also appears as a character in the opera, Shadowboxer, based on the life of Joe Louis.

Schmeling figures prominently in the 2010 novel by P.F. Kluge A Call From Jersey.

In a novel by Curzio Malaparte, Kaputt (1944), Schmeling figures prominently in the chapter "Cricket in Poland" depicting a gathering in February 1942 hosted by Governor-General Dr. Hans Frank in the Belvedere palace in Warsaw.

Schmeling's role as a paratrooper in World War II is mentioned in the Günter Grass novel The Tin Drum (1959).

For the film Max Schmeling – Eine deutsche Legende (2010) another former boxing champion, who moreover had known him, played Max Schmeling: Henry Maske.

The Voyagers! episode "All Fall Down" depicts his second fight with Joe Louis. The series' time travelling protagonists Phineas Bogg and Jeffrey Jones convinced Louis not to back out of the fight and witnessed his victory over Schmeling in Yankee Stadium on 22 June 1938.

Schmeling is mentioned in the song Ambling Alp by indie-band Yeasayer, "Oh Max Schmeling was a formidable foe, Ambling Alp was too at least that's what I'm told"

Schmeling is also referenced in the video game Call of Duty: Black Ops 4 by the German character Richtofen when he is hit by a zombie in the "Alpha Omega" DLC Zombies mode map ("OW! What are you, the undead Max Schmeling?!").

In Season 6, Episode 7 of Better Call Saul, Schmeling is compared to the character of Howard Hamlin when the title character opens the front door saying, "I'll get it. Just in case Max Schmeling comes in swinging."

Honorary residencies
 Honorary Resident of the City of Los Angeles
 Honorary Resident of Las Vegas
 Honorary Resident of Klein-Luckow (his hometown)
 Honorary Member of the Austrian Boxing Federation

Professional boxing record

Literature and media
 Kluge, Volker:Max Schmeling. Aufbau, Berlin 2004, .
 Krauß, Martin: Schmeling. Die Karriere eines Jahrhundertdeutschen. Die Werkstatt, Göttingen 2005, .
 David Margolick: Beyond Glory. Joe Louis Vs. Max Schmeling, and a World on the Brink. Knopf, New York 2005, .
 Pfeifer, David: Max Schmeling – Berufsboxer, Propagandafigur. Unternehmer. Die Geschichte eines deutschen Idols. Campus, Frankfurt am Main 2005, .
 Max Schmeling erzählt aus seinem Leben. Berührung. Hörbuch. Unterlauf & Zschiedrich Hörbuchverlag Berlin 2003, .

Films
 Joe & Max. Fernsehfilm, USA, Deutschland, 2002, 109 Min., Regie: Steve, u.a. mit Til Schweiger als Max Schmeling
 ARD-Legenden: Max Schmeling. Dokumentation, ARD 2003, 45 Min., Regie: Michael Wulfes
 Der Kampf des Jahrhunderts. Max Schmeling gegen Joe Louis. Dokumentation, USA, 2004, 87 Min., Regie: Barak Goodman,  von Phoenix
 Max Schmeling. Kinofilm, Bundesrepublik Deutschland, 2010, 123 min., Regie: Uwe Boll, mit Henry Maske als Max Schmeling, Susanne Wuest als Anny Ondra, Vladimir Weigl als Joe Jacobs, u.v.a.

See also
 List of heavyweight boxing champions
 List of European Boxing Union heavyweight champions

References

External links

Boxing Hall of Fame
ESPN.com
PBS biography of Max Schmeling
BBC obituary for Max Schmeling
Youtube video of the Schmeling-Sharkey fight
Max Schmeling – CBZ Profile
East Side Boxing article on Max Schmeling
'The Mirror and Max Schmeling', obituary (American Spectator)

NPR memorial (with audio)
The Fight of the Century NPR special on the selection of the radio broadcast to the 2005 National Recording Registry
Max Schmeling on the Hindenburg
Max Schmeling at IMDB
 

|-

1905 births
2005 deaths
Heavyweight boxers
German male boxers
American male boxers
Coca-Cola people
World Boxing Association champions
World heavyweight boxing champions
European Boxing Union champions
International Boxing Hall of Fame inductees
Fallschirmjäger of World War II
Knights Commander of the Order of Merit of the Federal Republic of Germany
People from Vorpommern-Greifswald
People from the Province of Brandenburg
Sportspeople from Mecklenburg-Western Pomerania